Romanians in Italy (Romanian: românii in Italia; Italian: romeni in Italia or rumeni in Italia) became a significant population after 1999, due to a large wave of emigration known in Romania as Fenomenul migrației către UE (the phenomenon of migration toward the European Union). A large part of Romanian emigrants went to Spain or Italy, whose national languages are Romance languages like Romanian. They were followed by another wave beginning in 2002, when Romanian citizens obtained the right to move to any Schengen Zone country without a visa. In 2007 Romania joined the European Union, further increasing the economic and political ties between the countries.

, there were 1,083,771 Romanian citizens living in Italy, the largest Romanian immigrant population in any country as well as the largest immigrant group within Italy.

Between 2008 and 2020, 98,499 Romanians acquired Italian citizenship.

Demographics

Population

Religion
In the years 2011 and 2012 the ISTAT made a survey regarding the religious affiliation among the immigrants in Italy, the religion of the Romanian people in Italy were as follows:
 Orthodox Christians: 79.0%
 Catholics: 13.9%
 Protestants: 2.2%
 Muslims: 0.1%
 Non religious: 2.7%
 Other religions: 2.2%

Notable people
 This list includes people of Romanian origin born in Italy or people born in Romania but mainly active in Italy.

Dinu Adameșteanu (1913–2004), archaeologist
Alexandra Agiurgiuculese (b. 2001), rhythmic gymnast
Chris Avram (1931–1989), actor
Ramona Bădescu (b. 1968), actress and television host
Paolo Bonolis (b. 1961), television host
Cristian Chivu (b. 1980), football player
Fritz Dennerlein (1936–1992), freestyle swimmer
Iosif Drăgan (1917–2008), businessman and historian
Nicolao Dumitru (b. 1991), football player
Loredana Errore (b. 1984), singer-songwriter
Mădălina Ghenea (b. 1987), actress and model
Claudia Koll (b. 1965), actress and missionary
Veronica Lazăr (1938–2014), actress
Marius Mitrea (b. 1982), rugby union referee
Ana Caterina Morariu (b. 1980), actress
Gabriele Oriali (b. 1952), football player
Cristina Pîrv (b. 1972), volleyball player
Bogdan Rath (b. 1972), water polo player
Andreea Stefanescu (b. 1993), rhythmic gymnast
Cristian Stoica (b. 1976), rugby union footballer
Linda Valori (b. 1978), singer
Roman Vlad (1919–2013), composer and pianist
Virginia Zeani (b. 1925), soprano

See also

 Italy–Romania relations
 Romanian diaspora

References

External links 
 La comunità romena in Italia website

 
Italy
 
Romanian minorities in Europe